Robert Lane (1527 – c. 1588) was an English politician. He was the son of Sir Ralph Lane and Lady Maud Parr (a daughter of William Parr, 1st Baron Parr of Horton and cousin of Queen Catherine Parr.  

He was a member (MP) of the Parliament of England for Northamptonshire in March 1553, and 1571, and for Gatton in 1563.

He married Katherine Copley (d.1563) and had three sons: Sir William Lane, Sir Parr Lane and Sir Robert Lane.

References

1527 births
1588 deaths
English MPs 1553 (Edward VI)
English MPs 1563–1567
English MPs 1571